Bachau is a small rural hamlet of about a dozen dwellings in Anglesey, north Wales, which is 137 miles (220.5 km) from Cardiff and 218.1 miles (351 km) from London. Bachau is represented in the Senedd by Rhun ap Iorwerth (Plaid Cymru). In the House of Commons it is part of the Ynys Môn constituency.
It lies in the community of Llanerchymedd.

External links 
photos of Bachau and surrounding area on geograph

References

Villages in Anglesey
Llannerch-y-medd